The 1989 East Coast Conference men's basketball tournament was held March 4–6, 1989.  The champion gained and an automatic berth to the NCAA tournament.

Bracket and results

* denotes overtime game

All-Tournament Team
 Ted Aceto, Bucknell
 Mike Butts, Bucknell – Tournament MVP
 Otis Ellis, Lafayette
 Mike Joseph, Bucknell
 Greg Leggett, Bucknell
Source

References

East Coast Conference (Division I) men's basketball tournament
Tournament